Exocelis is a genus of worms belonging to the family Haploposthiidae.

The species of this genus are found in Central America.

Species:

Exocelis exopenis 
Exocelis reedi

References

Acoelomorphs